Aliaksandr Uladzimiravich Anishchanka (born 15 April 1979), also known as Aleksandr Vladimirovich Anishchenko, is a Belarusian male weightlifter, competing in the 85 kg category and representing Belarus at international competitions. He participated at the 2004 Summer Olympics in the 85 kg event. He competed at world championships, most recently at the 2003 World Weightlifting Championships.

Major results

References

External links
 
 

1979 births
Living people
Belarusian male weightlifters
Weightlifters at the 2004 Summer Olympics
Olympic weightlifters of Belarus
Place of birth missing (living people)
World Weightlifting Championships medalists